Paul Mealor CStJ CLJ OSS FRSA (born 25 November 1975) is a Welsh composer. A large proportion of his output is for chorus, both a cappella and accompanied. He came to wider notice when his motet Ubi Caritas et Amor was performed at the wedding of Prince William and Catherine Middleton in 2011. He later composed the song "Wherever You Are", which became the 2011 Christmas number one in the UK Singles Chart. He has also composed an opera, three symphonies, concerti and chamber music.

Biography
Born in St Asaph, Denbighshire, North Wales, Mealor studied composition privately with William Mathias and John Pickard and then read music at the University of York (1994–2002). He studied composition at York with Nicola LeFanu, and in Copenhagen at the Royal Danish Academy of Music with Hans Abrahamsen (1998–99).

Since 2003, he has taught in the University of Aberdeen, where he is currently Professor of Composition and he has held visiting professorships in composition in institutions in Scandinavia and the United States. He is a Fellow of the Royal Society of Arts and since 2011 has been published by Novello. Also in 2011, he signed to Decca Records. His first album for Decca, A Tender Light  – a collection of sacred choral anthems – spent six weeks at No 1 in the Classical charts.

Mealor's motet, a setting of Now Sleeps the Crimson Petal (rearranged as Ubi Caritas et Amor), was commissioned by Prince William for his marriage to Catherine Middleton at Westminster Abbey on 29 April 2011, when it was sung by the Choirs of Westminster Abbey and Her Majesty's Chapel Royal conducted by James O'Donnell. Later that year, Mealor was commissioned to write the music for Wherever You Are, a song setting a text compiled from letters written to British Army military personnel deployed on active service in the Afghanistan War by their wives or partners, as part of the BBC Two television series The Choir: Military Wives. The single, released on 19 December 2011, became the 2011 Christmas number one in the UK Singles Chart and raised money for military charities. In the 2012 Classic FM Hall of Fame, he was voted the 'nation's favourite living composer' and succeeded in achieving the highest placing of any new entry in the history of the Hall of Fame with Wherever You Are charting at No 5.

In 2012, he was appointed a Free Burgess of the City of Aberdeen.

In 2013 Mealor composed the song "With a friend like you" for the final of the second season of the BBC 2 series "The Choir: Sing while you work". All three choirs of the final presented the song at Ely Cathedral. The P&O choir was declared winner.

In April 2014, Mealor's follow up album to "A Tender Light" was released titled "I Saw Eternity". "I Saw Eternity" which reached No 1 in the Specialist classical charts.

In September 2014, it was announced that he had been appointed President of Tŷ Cerdd (which promotes Welsh Music to the world), and Patron of the Welsh Music Guild.

In January 2018, he was appointed as an Officer of the Venerable Order of St John (OStJ). In March 2023 he was promoted to Commander (CStJ)  by HM King Charles III.

In May 2019, he was appointed to the Order of the Scottish Samurai (OSS) at Great Shogun Level.

In March 2020 he was appointed a Commander of The Catholic Order of St Lazarus of Jerusalem (CLJ) and in November 2020 he was awarded The Saltire Society Fletcher of Saltoun Award for his outstanding contribution to arts and humanities in Scotland. He is only the second composer, after Sir James MacMillan to be given the award.

In 2023, Mealor was announced as one of the composers who would create a brand new piece for the Coronation of Charles III and Camilla.

Selected works

 Symphony No 4 'At the haunted end of day''' (Orchestra, 2022. Duration: 20 minutes). Commissioned and premiered by the Welsh Chamber Orchestra in June 2022 conducted by Anthony Hose. 
 Wonders of the Celtic Deep (Orchestra & Chorus, 2021. Duration: 240 minutes). Orchestral score for the four-part BBC Wales/ OneTribe TV series.
 Piano Concerto (Orchestra, 2020. Duration: 20 minutes). Commissioned by JAM on the Marsh and the North Wales International Music Festival and Premiered in August 2020 by John Frederick Hudson (Piano) and the London Mozart Players conducted by Michael Bawtree.
  Symphony No 3: Illumination (Orchestra, 2018. Duration: 40 minutes). Commissioned by the BBC National Orchestra of Wales and premieres by them at Hoddinott Hall, Cardiff, 30 November 2018 Euphonium Concerto (Orchestra, 2017. Duration: 16 minutes). Commissioned by the Welsh Proms and premiered by David Childs (Euphonium) and the Royal Philharmonic Orchestra conducted by Owain Arwel Hughes CBE at St David's Hall, Cardiff, July 2017.
  Symphony No 2: Sacred Places (Orchestra, 2016. Duration: 25 minutes). Commissioned by the North Wales International Music Festival and premiered by the New Sinfonia conducted by Robert Guy in September 2016
  Symphony No 1: Passiontide (soprano and baritone soloists, chorus and orchestra, 2015. Duration: 1 hour and 10 minutes). Libretto by Peter Davidson. Commissioned and premiered by Jillian Bain Christie (soprano), Sean McCarther (Baritone), the University of Aberdeen Chamber Choir and the Orchestra of Scottish Opera, conducted by James Jordan on 19 November 2015 at St Machar's Cathedral, Aberdeen. 
 Celtic Prayers (children's choir, chorus & orchestra, 2014). Libretto by Grahame Davies. Commissioned by the BBC and first performed by the BBC National Chorus and Orchestra of Wales at St David's Hall Cardiff on 1 March 2014.
 The Farthest Shore (chorus, boys choir, brass & organ, 2013). Libretto by Ben Kaye. Commissioned by the John Armitage Memorial and first performed in St David's Cathedral on 28 May 2013.
 Crucifixus (baritone, chorus and optional accompaniment, 2012).
 Wherever You Are (chorus, 2011).
 Ubi Caritas et Amor (chorus, 2011). A revised setting of Now Sleeps the Crimson Petal.
 Now Sleeps the Crimson Petal (4 madrigals)(chorus, 2010). Commissioned by the John Armitage Memorial Trust and first performed by the combined choirs of St Salvator's (St Andrews) Chapel Choir, University of Aberdeen Chamber Choir and Edinburgh University Chamber Choir, conducted by Michael Bawtree in Holy Trinity Church, St Andrews, October 2010.
 She Walks in Beauty (chorus, 2010). Text by Lord Byron, written for Octavoce.
 Sanctuary Haunts (chorus, 2009). Commissioned by University of Aberdeen and first performed by Polyphony (choir) and Stephen Layton on 5 February 2010.
 Stabat Mater (chorus & piano, 2009). Revised version (chorus, harp and string orchestra, 2010) premiered by the St Andrews Chorus and Heisenberg Ensemble, conducted by Michael Downes, St Andrews, November 2010.
 Between Eternity and Time (soprano & piano, 2008). Three Settings of Emily Dickinson commissioned by Irene Drummond and Alasdair Beatson and first performed by them at King's College Chapel, Aberdeen on 6 November 2008.
 Let Fall the Windows of Mine Eyes (chorus, 2008). Commissioned by the Voices of Shakespeare Festival (Brecon) and first performed by Con Anima on 12 July 2008 at the Living Willow Theatre, Brecon.
 The Shadows of Dreams (soprano, cello & piano, 2007). First performed by Sarah Leonard (soprano), Ian Mitchell (Clarinet) and Huw Watkins (Piano), Elphinstone Hall, Aberdeen, 20 April 2008.
 Aurora Lucis Rutilat (organ, 2006). Composed for Roger Williams (organist) and first performed by him at King's College, Cambridge, February 2007
 Liturgy of Fire (symphonic wind ensemble, 2006). Commissioned and first performed by the New York University Wind Ensemble conducted by Christian Wilhjelm at the Frederick Loewe Theatre, New York on 6 December 2006.
 De Profundis (organ, 2005). Commissioned by George Chittenden and first performed by him at St Patrick's Cathedral, Dublin, 6 August 2005.
 Borderlands (piano trio, 2004). First performed by the Chagall Trio at the University of Manchester.
 And Profoundest Midnight Shroud The Serene Lights of Heaven (chorus, 2002). Text by Rilke and Shelley. Commissioned by and first performed by York Vocal Index, directed by John Potter, at the Sir Jack Lyons Hall, York, May 2002.
 Elegy for a Play of Shadows (2001). Version 1 (cor anglais and harp) first performed by Eamonn O'Dwyer at Sir Jack Lyons Hall, York. Version 2 (cor anglais and five instruments) first performed by the Britten Sinfonia conducted by Nicholas Cleobury in Canterbury, November 2001.
 Hidden Arias (2001) (oboe). First performed by Melinda Maxwell at Dartington Hall, August 2001.
 Rising of The Sixfold Sun (orchestra, 2000). First performed by the BBC National Orchestra of Wales conducted by Thomas Dausgaard, St David's Hall, Cardiff, February 2000.

Discography
 Madrigali: Fire & Roses (Divine Art DDA 25094) Con Anima Chamber Choir directed by Paul Mealor. Includes Mealor's Now Sleeps the Crimson Petal and Morten Lauridsen's Madrigali and Chanson Éloignée.
 Mealor: Stabat Mater (Campion Cameo 2083) – Irene Drummond (soprano); Drew Tulloch (piano) Con Anima Chamber Choir/Paul Mealor. Includes Stabat Mater; Let Fall the Windows of Mine Eyes; Between Eternity and Time; Beata es, Virgo Maria; Lux Benigna; Ave.
 Borderlands (Campion Cameo 2053) – Chagall Trio. Includes Mealor's Borderlands.
 Christmas Favourites from Aberdeen (KCL 2009) – Chapel Choir of King's College, Aberdeen/ Roger Williams (organist). Includes Mealor's Locus Iste.
 A Tender Light (Decca Classics 4764814) – Tenebrae and the Royal Philharmonic Orchestra conducted by Nigel Short. Includes Now Sleeps the Crimson Petal, She Walks in Beauty, O Vos Omnes, Stabat Mater, Salvator Mundi, Ubi Caritas.
 I Saw Eternity (Decca Classics 4810494) – Tenebrae and the Aurora Orchestra conducted by Nigel Short. Includes Peace, I Saw Eternity and Crucifixus.
  Immortal Memory - A Burns Night Celebration (Vox Regis) - University of Aberdeen Chamber Choir conducted by the composer
 Serenity (GIA Publications CD-1078) - The Same Stream, conducted by James Jordan (conductor)''

References

External links
Official website
University of Aberdeen, Dept. of Music
Con Anima
Paul Mealor's YouTube channel

1975 births
Living people
People from St Asaph
Alumni of the University of York
Welsh classical composers
Welsh male classical composers
20th-century classical composers
21st-century classical composers
Classical composers of church music
Academics of the University of Aberdeen
20th-century Welsh musicians
21st-century Welsh musicians
20th-century British composers
21st-century British composers
20th-century British male musicians
21st-century British male musicians
Officers of the Order of St John
Recipients of the Order of Saint Lazarus (statuted 1910)